is a retired shot putter and hammer thrower from Japan, who won a silver medal in each event at the Asian Games. He competed in the hammer throw at the 1968 and 1972 Olympics and placed 13th and 25th, respectively.

References

1944 births
Living people
Japanese male shot putters
Japanese male hammer throwers
Japanese male discus throwers
Olympic male hammer throwers
Olympic athletes of Japan
Athletes (track and field) at the 1968 Summer Olympics
Athletes (track and field) at the 1972 Summer Olympics
Asian Games silver medalists for Japan
Asian Games medalists in athletics (track and field)
Athletes (track and field) at the 1966 Asian Games
Athletes (track and field) at the 1970 Asian Games
Medalists at the 1966 Asian Games
Medalists at the 1970 Asian Games
Universiade medalists in athletics (track and field)
Universiade gold medalists for Japan
Medalists at the 1967 Summer Universiade
Asian Athletics Championships winners
Japan Championships in Athletics winners
20th-century Japanese people
21st-century Japanese people